In enzymology, a ferredoxin–NAD+ reductase is an enzyme that catalyzes the chemical reaction:

reduced ferredoxin + NAD+  oxidized ferredoxin + NADH + H+

Thus, the two substrates of this enzyme are reduced ferredoxin and NAD+, whereas its 3 products are oxidized ferredoxin, NADH, and H+. This enzyme participates in fatty acid metabolism.

This enzyme belongs to the family of oxidoreductases, specifically those acting on iron-sulfur proteins as donor with NAD+ or NADP+ as acceptor.

The systematic name of this enzyme is ferredoxin:NAD+ oxidoreductase. There are a variety of names in common use:
ferredoxin–nicotinamide adenine dinucleotide reductase
ferredoxin reductase
NAD+-ferredoxin reductase
ferredoxin–NAD+ reductase
ferredoxin–linked NAD+ reductase
ferredoxin–NAD reductase

When NAD molecule is in its reduced form, the enzyme is referred to as:
NADH-ferredoxin oxidoreductase
reduced nicotinamide adenine dinucleotide-ferredoxin
NADH-ferredoxin reductase
NADH flavodoxin oxidoreductase
NADH2-ferredoxin oxidoreductase

Other enzymes in the family include:
NADH-ferredoxin NAP reductase (component of naphthalene dioxygenase multicomponent enzyme system)
NADH-ferredoxin TOL reductase (component of toluene dioxygenase)

Structural studies

As of late 2007, only one structure has been solved for this class of enzymes, with the PDB accession code .

References

 

EC 1.18.1
NADH-dependent enzymes
Enzymes of known structure